Katalin Pálinger (born 6 December 1978) is a former Hungarian handball goalkeeper who most notably played for Győri Audi ETO KC.

Career

She made her international debut on 22 August 1997 against Romania, and participated in her first World Championship in that year, however, she finished with the national team only on the disappointing ninth place. One year later, on the 1998 European Championship Hungary performed slightly better and captured a bronze medal, followed by a gold on the next continental event. Pálinger took part on another five European Championships (2002, 2004, 2006, 2008, 2010), achieving the best result in 2004 by winning a bronze.

In 2000, beside the European Championship title she has also won an Olympic silver, after losing out in an epic final against Denmark. The Scandinavians faced a six-goal deficit with less than fifteen minutes from the match, when the Hungarian team collapsed and the Danes went to win by four and took the gold medal. Pálinger participated on further two Olympic Games in 2004 and 2008 finishing fifth and fourth, respectively.

In addition, there are two World Championship medals on her success list, a silver from 2003 and a bronze from 2005. The shot-stopper has the experience of six World Championships under her belt, having been participated on every tournament between 1997 and 2007.

Pálinger announced her retirement from international handball on 11 June 2011, following the unsuccessful World Championship qualifying campaign. She made her farewell appearance on 3 June 2012 against Belarus in a European Championship qualifier. She currently acts as an assistant coach to the national team.

Achievements
Nemzeti Bajnokság I:
Winner: 2001, 2003, 2004, 2008, 2009, 2010, 2011, 2012
Silver Medalist: 2002, 2005
Bronze Medalist: 1998, 1999, 2000
Magyar Kupa:
Winner: 2002, 2004, 2008, 2009, 2010, 2011, 2012
Slovenian Championship:
Winner: 2007
Slovenian Cup:
Winner: 2007
EHF Champions League:
Finalist: 2009, 2012
Semifinalist: 2004, 2005, 2008, 2010, 2011
EHF Cup:
Finalist: 1999, 2003
Olympic Games:
Silver Medalist: 2000
World Championship:
Silver Medalist: 2003
Bronze Medalsit: 2005
European Championship:
Winner: 2000
Bronze Medalist: 1998, 2004

Individual awards
 Hungarian Handballer of the Year: 2003, 2004, 2010

References

External links
 Katalin Pálinger player profile on Győri Audi ETO KC Official Website
 Katalin Pálinger career statistics at Worldhandball

1978 births
Living people
People from Mosonmagyaróvár
Hungarian female handball players
Olympic silver medalists for Hungary
Handball players at the 2000 Summer Olympics
Handball players at the 2008 Summer Olympics
Olympic handball players of Hungary
Olympic medalists in handball
Győri Audi ETO KC players
Medalists at the 2000 Summer Olympics
Sportspeople from Győr-Moson-Sopron County